Banded Peak is a  summit located in the Elbow River valley of Kananaskis Country in the Canadian Rockies of Alberta, Canada. Banded Peak has a distinctive limestone cliff band which gave it its descriptive name. Its name has been used since around 1896. The peak is visible from Highway 66, weather permitting. The mountain's name became official in 1951 by the Geographical Names Board of Canada.

Geology

Banded Peak is composed of sedimentary rock laid down during the Precambrian to Jurassic periods. Formed in shallow seas, this sedimentary rock was pushed east and over the top of younger rock during the Laramide orogeny.

Climate

Based on the Köppen climate classification, Banded Peak is located in a subarctic climate with cold, snowy winters, and mild summers.

See also
List of mountains of Canada

References

Two-thousanders of Alberta
Alberta's Rockies